Peston is the flagship political discussion programme on British television network ITV, usually recorded live on Wednesday evenings at 9pm. It is broadcast live on Twitter (the first terrestrial UK programme to do so) and then played out after the News at Ten at 10.45pm (usually later on STV). It was announced on 5 June 2018 that the show would launch in the autumn of that year as a continuation of Peston on Sunday. The programme is presented by Robert Peston, the Political Editor of ITV News, and features a combination of interviews with politicians and public figures alongside analysis of the major news events of the week.

Format
According to ITV, Peston intends to "provide viewers with a fresh, intelligent and lively perspective on the big matters of the day." Political and cultural guests join Robert Peston in the studio or remotely for interviews, with analysis from Anushka Asthana and 'Screeny', the show's large touchscreen which also features social media interaction.

The show launched on 26 September with its own emoji on Twitter promoting the launch. The emoji appears when any user tweets #Peston.

The programme is broadcast from TC2 at BBC Studioworks' Television Centre in West London and shares a studio with Lorraine and Loose Women.

Episodes

Run 1

The show launched on 26 September 2018 for its initial run.

Run 2

Peston returned in the New Year to cover the run-up to Britain's scheduled departure from the EU on 29 March.

Run 3

Peston returned after Easter in 2019, covering a period including the Local and European elections and the Conservative Leadership race to replace Theresa May as PM.

Run 4

Peston was back on air after the summer on 4 September 2019, returning with an interview with the PM Boris Johnson and ending with coverage of the snap UK General Election

Run 5

The show returned to air on 15 January 2020 staying on air throughout lockdown to cover the COVID-19 pandemic, including a number of episodes with Robert Peston himself in isolation.

Run 6

Peston returned following the summer break in September 2020 to discuss the ongoing management of the COVID-19 pandemic, UK-EU Free Trade Deal negotiations and the US Presidential Election.

Run 7

The show returned from a Christmas break as the UK returned to Covid lockdown to combat a severe second wave of the virus.

Run 8

The show returned from a summer break in September 2021.

Run 9 
The show returned from a Christmas break in January 2022.

References

External links 

 

2018 British television series debuts
2010s British television talk shows
2020s British television talk shows
English-language television shows
ITV news shows
Television series by ITV Studios